U.S. Route 366 or US 366 was the designation of two child routes of the former U.S. Route 66 in New Mexico and Texas during the late 1920s and 1930s. Both alignments of US 366 were original U.S. Routes created in 1927. The first alignment was a route from El Paso, Texas to Amarillo, Texas crossing through New Mexico that existed until 1932. The second was a route from Albuquerque to Willard that was previously designated U.S. Route 470 before 1932. That alignment was canceled in 1939.

History
This iteration of US 366 replaced US 470 in New Mexico, which was also one of the original routes of the 1927 AASHO log. The parent route of U.S. 470 was US 70 which it met at Willard. US 470 followed part of the route of  NM 41 north from Willard to Moriarty, and  NM 6 west to Albuquerque where it ended at the combined route of US 66 and US 85. US 470 was renamed US 366 when US 70 was relocated southward over the previous US 366 ending the parent route connection, but creating a new one with US 66. In the late 1930s, US 66 was rerouted south from its original path through Santa Fe over to NM 6 from Albuquerque to Santa Rosa including the section of US 366 west of Moriarty. At that time, US 366's designation was canceled, and the portion between Willard and Moriarty retained its NM 41 designation. The segment between Albuquerque and Moriarty is now part of  I-40 and  NM 333.

Route description
The final alignment of US 366 began at the intersection of NM 6 with the combined routes US 66 and US 85 at Albuquerque in Bernalillo County. The route proceeded to the east along NM 6 and intersected  NM 10 at Tijeras. The route then passed through Barton and then crossed the southwestern corner of Santa Fe County. The route then entered Torrance County where the route intersected NM 41 at Moriarty. The route then turned south along NM 41 and passed through Estancia before terminating at US 60 just west of Willard.

The 1930 state highway map described the route as a first class road usable all year. From Albuquerque to a point just west of Tijeras, the highway had an oiled and concrete surface. From that point to Barton, the highway had a gravel surface. From Barton to Moriarty, the surface was graded, and the surface was gravel beyond Moriarty to Willard.

Major intersections

References

66-3 1932
U.S. Highways in New Mexico
3 (1932–1939)
66-3 1932